Seth Doliboa (born 1 December 1980) is an American former basketball player who played for S.L. Benfica in Portugal. After a few years in the National Basketball Development League, he decided to travel to Europe, where he began to achieve more success.

Honours

Club
Benfica
 Portuguese League (5): 2008–09, 2011–12, 2012–13, 2013–14, 2014–15
Portuguese Cup: 2013–14, 2014–15
 League Cup: 2012–13, 2013–14, 2014–15
 Portuguese Supercup: 2012, 2013, 2014
 António Pratas Trophy: 2008, 2011, 2012, 2014
 Supertaça Portugal-Angola: 2009–10

Individual
Portuguese Basketball League All-Star game MVP, Regular Season MVP: 2008–09

References

1980 births
Living people
American expatriate basketball people in Germany
American expatriate basketball people in Portugal
American expatriate basketball people in Turkey
Anaheim Arsenal players
Basketball players from Ohio
Bowling Green Falcons men's basketball players
Columbus Riverdragons players
People from Springboro, Ohio
Power forwards (basketball)
Roanoke Dazzle players
Skyliners Frankfurt players
S.L. Benfica basketball players
Wright State Raiders men's basketball players
American men's basketball players